Blacha is a surname. Notable people with the surname include:

Anja Blacha (born 1990), German mountaineer
David Blacha (born 1990), Polish footballer
Tommy Blacha (born 1962), American comedy writer

See also

Blacha, Ávila, a populated place in Spain